Suphawut Thueanklang is a Thai futsal pivot and currently a member of Thailand national futsal team.

Honours

Domestic
All with Chonburi Bluewave Futsal Club
Thailand Futsal League
Winners (7): 2009, 2010, 2011–2012, 2012–2013, 2014, 2015, 2016
Thai FA Futsal Cup
Winners (4): 2010, 2011–2012, 2014, 2015

All with Nagoya Oceans
F.League
Winners (2): 2020-21, 2021-22

Continental

AFC Futsal Club Championship
Winners (2): 2013, 2017

Individual
 2012 FIFA Futsal World Cup Goal of The Tournament
 2013 AFC Futsal Club Championship Qualification Asean/East Zone Top Scorer
 2013 AFC Futsal Club Championship Most Valuable Player
 2013 AFC Futsal Player of the Year
 2016 AFC Futsal Championship Top Scorer (14 goals)
 2016 FIFA Futsal World Cup Goal of The Tournament

International career

International honours
AFC Futsal Championship
Runners-up (1): 2012
Third place (1): 2016
Asian Indoor Games
Runners-up (1): 2009
Third place (1): 2013
AFF Futsal Championship
Winners (6): 2008, 2009, 2012, 2013, 2014, 2015, 2019
Southeast Asian Games
Winners (2): 2011, 2013, 2017

International goals

 Total Goals = 199

Royal decoration 
 2015 –  Commander (Third Class) of The Most Admirable Order of the Direkgunabhorn

References

Suphawut Thueanklang
1989 births
Living people
Futsal forwards
Suphawut Thueanklang
Suphawut Thueanklang
Suphawut Thueanklang
Southeast Asian Games medalists in futsal
Competitors at the 2011 Southeast Asian Games
Thai expatriate sportspeople in Indonesia
Thai expatriate sportspeople in Spain
Thai expatriate sportspeople in Iran
Thai expatriate sportspeople in Lebanon
Thai expatriate sportspeople in Japan